Procureur du Roi v Benoît and Gustave Dassonville (1974) Case 8/74 is an EU law case of the European Court of Justice, in which a 'distinctly applicable measure of equivalent effect' to a quantitative restriction of trade in the European Union was held to exist on a Scotch whisky imported from France.

Facts
Benoit and Dassonville claimed that their prosecution for selling Scotch whisky without a certificate was contrary to the TEEC article 30 (now TFEU art 34). A Belgian law said Scotch whisky and other products that had a designation of origin could only be sold if accompanied with a certificate of origin. Competitors had exclusive dealing arrangements with UK exporters, and so they had acquired the whisky from France. However, in France, it was impossible to obtain a certificate because French law did not require certificates. Benoit and Dassonville were accused of forging a certificate and prosecuted. In response, they challenged the legality of the certificate law, based on the rule in article 30 that there should be no quantitative restrictions on trade, or measures of equivalent effect. The Belgian authorities, the Procureur du Roi contended that because the purpose was to protect consumers, not regulate trade, the measure fell outside TEEC article 30. 

The Belgian court referred the case to the European Court of Justice, as is permitted under TEEC article 234 (now TFEU art 267).

Judgment
The Court of Justice held that the requirement for a certificate in Belgian law was contrary to article 34 of the Treaty on the Functioning of the European Union.

Significance
Horspool and Humphreys note that this decision could include a "huge" range of restrictions and that the court has sought to limit the scope of the Dassonville decision, in cases such as Cassis de Dijon, which was decided a few years later.

See also

EU law

References

External links
Decision of ECJ at Europa Website

1974 in case law
1974 in Belgium
European Union goods case law